Kendriya Vidyalaya Bolarum (KVB), is one of the reputed schools in Secunderabad city of Telangana. It was started in the year 1980, then shifted to its new campus on 1993. The school is affiliated to the Central Board of Secondary Education, New Delhi.

History 
Kendriya Vidyalaya, Bolarum was started in 1980. Col. G.S. Kapoor was the first chairman of the Vidyalaya and Mr. Jones Deva Prasad was its first principal. The Vidyalaya was initially was housed in the impermanent Cavalry Barracks of Bison canteen near Nag Mandir.  The school at that time did not have the modern amenities infrastructure that is present today, however still it carries the crown of being one of the best school in the twin cities.

Growth of the School
Initially the school had only I to V classes. At the beginning only a few teachers joined and gradually the school was upgraded and the expansion of the campus took place  and the infrastructure was developed. The labs were gradually equipped. The very first sports day of the Vidyalaya was conducted in Docca Stadium, near Lothkunta, Secunderabad.

By 1984, the school was extended up to class X. Under the able guidance of Sri. Achunni the then Assistant Commissioner, Sri. S. Gondane, the then Principal, the school had carried out various projects and activities thereby making way for great future. Then the school had three sections from class I to X.

The school was moved into current location in the year 1993 which marked the start of a bright future, with four sections for each class. Now the school has +2 level with science and humanities streams. The subject accountancy was introduced as one of the options in the humanities stream.

The building has had bigger play grounds, better infrastructure and highly qualified and experienced staff. Since then the school continuously maintained and overall strength around 1600 to 1700.

In 1997 a cultural Extravaganza called "Bhartiyam" was presented at the EME Centre to mark the 50th year of India's Independence which turned out to be a huge success.

In connection with sports authorities of India yet  another cultural and sports show which included the famous dance from Kerala Kaikottikali and a splendid performance of gymnastics was presented by the students of K.V. Bolarum at Lal Bahadur Stadium.

In 1998 a series of population and development workshops were conducted at the school.

In 2008 All India KVS National Games and Sports Meet was conducted and K.V. Bolarum hosted National games for Lawn Tennis and Table Tennis. In 2009 the Vidyalaya started commerce stream at +2 level.

Location of the School
Initially the school was located near the Nag Mandir near Cavalry Barracks. The school did not have its Playground, all the sport event were organised at Docca Stadium.
Now, the school is moved to a new location situated in 1 EME Centre and 1.5 km from Lakadawala and 1.5 km from Eagle Chouk near RSI.The school has its own independent vast play grounds in approximately 2.5 acres.

See also 

Central Board of Secondary Education
Kendriya Vidyalaya
 List of Kendriya Vidyalayas
NCERT

References

External links 

CBSE
Kendriya Vidyalaya Sangathan
NCERT
Official Website
Sakshat 

Educational institutions established in 1980
Schools in Hyderabad, India
Kendriya Vidyalayas
1980 establishments in Andhra Pradesh